Jesse Huta Galung was the defending champion. He was supposed to play in the main draw, however withdrew before his match against Alban Meuffels. Marek Michalička replaced him and reached the semifinals, where he lost to eventual champion Igor Sijsling.

Dutch player won this tournament. He defeated Jan-Lennard Struff 7–6(7–2), 6–3 in the final.

Seeds

Draw

Finals

Top half

Bottom half

References
 Main Draw
 Qualifying Draw

TEAN International - Singles
TEAN International